Calligrapha serpentina, the globemallow leaf beetle, is a species of leaf beetle in the family Chrysomelidae. It is found in Mexico and the United States.

In 2021, several important taxonomic changes were made: the species Calligrapha mexicana was revalidated, reversing a long-held synonymy with C. serpentina, and the variety Calligrapha serpetina var. discrepans was upgraded in status to species as Calligrapha discrepans.

References

Further reading

 
 
 

Chrysomelinae
Articles created by Qbugbot
Beetles described in 1856
Beetles of North America
Beetles of the United States
Insects of Mexico